Glycine C-acetyltransferase is a protein that in humans is encoded by the GCAT gene.

Function 

The degradation of L-threonine to glycine consists of a two-step biochemical pathway involving the enzymes L-threonine dehydrogenase and 2-amino-3-ketobutyrate coenzyme A ligase. L-Threonine is first converted into 2-amino-3-ketobutyrate by L-threonine dehydrogenase. This gene encodes the second enzyme in this pathway, which then catalyzes the reaction between 2-amino-3-ketobutyrate and coenzyme A to form glycine and acetyl-CoA. The encoded enzyme is considered a class II pyridoxal-phosphate-dependent aminotransferase. Alternate splicing results in multiple transcript variants. A pseudogene of this gene is found on chromosome 14.

References

Further reading